The Patrick L. and Rose O. Ward House at 511 S Main St. in Springville, Utah, United States, was built in 1900.  It was listed on the National Register of Historic Places in 1998.

It was home of Patrick L. Ward, station master and superintendent of the Denver and Rio Grande Railroad in Springville.

References

Houses completed in 1900
Houses in Utah County, Utah
Houses on the National Register of Historic Places in Utah
Victorian architecture in Utah
National Register of Historic Places in Utah County, Utah
Buildings and structures in Springville, Utah
Individually listed contributing properties to historic districts on the National Register in Utah